The women's rhythmic group all-around competition at the 2019 European Games was held at the Minsk-Arena on 23 June 2019.

Results

References 

Women's rhythmic group all-around